Almonacid del Marquesado is a municipality in Cuenca, Castile-La Mancha, Spain. It had a population of 432 .

References 

Municipalities in the Province of Cuenca